Line 1 of the Mumbai Monorail is, as of 2018, the only current line in the monorail system for the city of Mumbai, India. It is also referred to as Jacob Circle-Wadala-Chembur line/corridor. Scomi Engineering built the line with local partner Larsen & Toubro; Scomi operates Line 1 on behalf of the Mumbai Metropolitan Region Development Authority (MMRDA).

After multiple delays it was finally opened on 3 March 2019.

Line 1 is the first monorail line in India, since the Kundala Valley Railway and Patiala State Monorail Trainways were closed in the 1920s. After the second phase was commissioned, Line 1 is the world's sixth longest monorail corridor

History

Background
The then Chief Minister of Maharashtra Vilasrao Deshmukh cleared the notification for the construction of the first monorail line in Mumbai on 18 August 2008. The line would connect Jacob Circle, Wadala and Mahul via Chembur, providing a feeder service to the existing Mumbai Suburban Railway.

Line 1 was implemented under the Public Private Partnership (PPP) model. Four consortia pre-qualified for the contract in January 2008. They were led by Reliance Industries, Essar, IL&FS Transportation Networks and Pioneer Infratech. The two consortia left in the final round were Bombardier Transportation-Reliance Energy-Hitachi Monorail, and Larsen and Toubro-Scomi Rail. On 11 November 2008, the winner was announced to be Larsen and Toubro (L&T) along with Malaysian partner Scomi. The consortium was awarded a  contract to build and operate the monorail until 2029. Scomi provided the design and integration for project as well as operating the monorail, while L&T was responsible for civil construction, ticketing and power supply. This was Scomi's first overseas project.

Construction

The foundation stone for the project was to be laid by Prime Minister Manmohan Singh on 29 November 2008, but was postponed following the 2008 Mumbai attacks. Then Maharashtra Chief Minister Ashok Chavan laid the foundation stone in a ceremony at the Acres Club, Chembur on 9 February 2009. The MMRDA commissioned the construction of the line in two phases. The first stretch linked Wadala with Chembur in the north-east, and the second connected Wadala with Jacob Circle in South Mumbai. The original deadline for the project was April 2011. The project has missed several deadlines for completion. The following months had all been announced as deadlines for the first phase - December 2010, May 2011, November 2011, May 2012, December 2012, June 2013, August 2013, 15 September 2013, October 2013 and December 2013. Deadlines announced for the second phase were May 2011, December 2011, May 2012, December 2012, December 2013, June 2014, December 2014, March 2015, December 2015 and "mid-2016".

A 108-meter test run was successfully conducted on 26 January 2010. The first test run took place on 18 February 2012. The first test of the entire 8.26 km stretch from Wadala Depot to Chembur was conducted by the MMRDA in November 2012.

Opening
Line 1 was formally inaugurated by Prithviraj Chavan on 1 February 2014 at the Wadala Depot monorail station. After flagging off the first monorail train (a red rake, rolling stock train #7) at 3:56pm, Chavan and other officials rode the entire route on the same train. The party then proceeded to Gandhi Maidan, 15th Road, Chembur (East), where Chavan declared the monorail "open". The monorail was opened to the public the following day, with the first trip commencing from Wadala Depot at 7:08am. The first train from the opposite side, departed Chembur at 7:10am Services had been scheduled to operate until 3:00pm, however, station doors were closed by 2:30pm due to larger than expected ridership. Services were operated until 4:30pm so that everyone with a ticket got the opportunity to ride the monorail. MMRDA spokesperson Dilip Kawathkar stated, "Although stations were closed, those who were standing in queue at the ticket counters in the station area were issued tokens for traveling and as per schedule, the train operations closed at 3 pm. An announcement to this effect was made at all monorail stations." The line maintained a headway of 12–13 minutes on average on opening day, although the frequency dropped to 20–30 minutes in the afternoon. On opening day, 19,678 passengers travelled on the line. Sixty-six services were operated on the first day, netting a revenue of  through the sale of tickets and smart cards.

According to the MMRDA, between 2 February and 1 March, a total of 4,58,871 commuters used the monorail, generating a total revenue 44,66,522. The average daily ridership dropped from 20,000 during the first few weeks to 15,000 by March 2014. The monorail was closed for the first time on 17 March 2014 due to Holi.

The decision to add escalators was taken in mid-2012. Installation was scheduled to be completed by June 2014. Escalators have been installed at Wadala, Chembur, Mysore Colony and Fertilizer Township.

Phase 2 from Wadala Depot to Jacob Circle was inaugurated by Chief Minister Devendra Fadnavis on 2 March 2019.

Proposed Future Extension
There have been calls among several experts to extend the Mumbai Monorail Line 1 from its current southern endpoint of Jacob Circle to further east for 2 kilometers  to Worli  via E Moses Road and also then to extend from the current starting point of Chembur monorail station and extend  by 3 km north to  Ghatkopar Station  via Mahul Road  thereby establishing a link between two currently unconnected Transportation hubs, thereby enhancing and adding on the current usability, reach and capacity of the system.

Route description
The following dates represent the dates the section opened to the public, not the private inauguration.

Infrastructure

Rolling stock

The monorail cars were built in Malaysia by Scomi Engineering Bhd. The first car was shipped to India on 2 January 2010. Six trains currently operate in the first phase of the line. Ten more will be added in the second phase.

Each monorail train consists of 4 coaches having a combined passenger capacity of 568. There are roughly 18 seated and 142 standing passengers at an average of seven persons per square metre per carriage (the end cars have a different capacity due to the driving position). The low number of seats was to ensure that the flow of people in and out of the coach was not hampered. Handrails and handgrips are installed in coaches, within easy reach of all standing passengers. A 4-coach monorail train has a total length of 44.8 metres, and each coach weighs 15 tonnes. All coaches are air-conditioned. There are 2 CCTV cameras installed in each coach.

To drive the monorail, train captains need to slide into the driver's seat and wait for the signal. The Vehicle Management System informs the driver of the speed, the amount of electricity being sent to each car, what the brakes are doing, the air pressure in every tyre, and the status of the doors, all in real time. Once all safety checks are completed, the driver can accelerate the train by moving a lever forward. The lever works like a throttle on an aircraft, and has two functions, forward for drive and back for brake. Trains can accelerate to 60 km/h in 23.35 seconds and 80 km/h in 41.51 seconds. Trains have disc brakes for optimum stopping power. When the lever is pulled back initially, regenerative braking is applied as the train's electric motor spins the other way and collects power rather than pushing it out. Pulling back harder on the lever, engages the disc brakes which can be used to reduce speed and bring the train to a halt. Another set of emergency disc brakes engages, in case the regular brake fails. At tight corners, the monorail banks at a six-degree angle and passes the corner without slowing down. Like all trains, the monorail also has a Dead Man's Switch, where the train's emergency brakes are applied if pressure is not maintained on the controller.

Stations

 
The stations are elevated, and can be reached by staircases and escalators. Each station has four escalators. Stations do not have any public toilets. Platforms at stations lack seating for commuters. Stations also lack other public conveniences such as drinking water. MMRDA commissioner U.P.S. Madan announced on 3 March 2014 that three benches would be installed on each platform, and drinking water facility would be provided at all stations "in couple of months". Personnel of the Maharashtra State Security Corporation (MSSC) are deployed at the stations.

The Chembur monorail station is connected with a skywalk to the Chembur railway station. However, the Wadala Depot station is at least 2 km away from the Wadala Road railway station. Skywalks have also been constructed at Bhakti Park and Wadala, and will be constructed at Ambedkar Nagar, Lower Parel and Jacob Circle.

Vehicle washing
Vehicle and train washing specialist Smith Bros & Webb was awarded a contract to provide Britannia Train Wash plants for the Mumbai Monorail. Smith Bros & Webb designs and manufactures its own wash equipment under the brand name of Britannia.

Safety and security
Every station on the line is equipped with Door Frame Metal Detectors (DFMDs), X-ray baggage scanners, CCTV cameras and comply with NFPA (National Fire Protection Agency) 130 norms. Officers in plainclothes ride the trains to curb trouble-makers, pickpockets and molesters. All stations have armed security guards at all entry points, and personnel of the Maharashtra State Security Corporation (MSSC) are deployed at the stations. MSSC personnel are armed with outdated .410 muskets, which MSSC expects to upgrade in the future. The decision to use outdated weapons was criticized by a guard, who told Mid Day that the weapon is "ineffective in a terror attack, as it reloads slowly."

The doors of coaches will not open when the train is in motion. Train captains receive breath analyser tests when they report for duty. Infractions are met by disciplinary action, fines, and criminal charges.

Operations

Operator
Scomi Engineering built and operated the monorail line. The MMRDA paid Scomi  monthly as fees for operating the line. The MMRDA terminated the Scomi and L&T consortium's contract to operate the monorail on 14 December 2018 citing failure to meet contractual obligations despite several deadline extensions. Subsequently, the MMRDA assumed control over the operations and maintenance of the monorail.

Ticketing
The Mumbai Monorail uses an automated fare collection system, where tickets are sold in the form of electronically programmed journey tokens. Tokens are valid for 20 minutes for use at the same station, and 90 minutes for exit at any other station. The minimum fare on the line is 5 and the maximum is 11. A smart card costs , of which 50 is a refundable security deposit and 50 can be used for travel. Children below 90 cm height ride for free. No tourist passes are sold. The MMRDA had planned to allow the purchase return tickets, but initially dropped plans due to "complications". However, same-day return journey tokens were introduced from October 2014. They are considering offering passes for daily, monthly, and quarterly use.

Fares
Fares as on 2 February 2015.

Frequency
Trains operate from 6am to 10pm, with the last service departing from both Wadala Depot and Chembur at 2207 (10:07pm). The services are operated every 15 minutes on the line. Trains have a top speed of 80 km/h, and an average speed of 65 km/h. The system has been designed for a 3-minute headway with operation from 05:00 to 24:00.

Monorail services initially operated only between 7am and 3pm, running 64 services per day. The MMRDA had stated that operating hours would be extended after authorities increased operations and maintenance staff, as well as studied the passenger traffic. MMRDA commissioner U.P.S. Madan announced on 3 March 2014 that monorail services would operate from 7am to 7pm before the end of that month. This was later postponed to mid-April, but plans were modified to operate the monorail in a 14-hour shift from 6am to 8pm. The MMRDA doubled its staff strength in order to operate the additional services. The monorail began operating from 6am to 8pm, starting 15 April 2014, bringing the total number of services operating per day to 112. Operating hours were further extended to 10pm starting 15 August 2014, increasing the number of daily services to 131.

Ridership
On opening day, 19,678 passengers travelled on the line. Sixty-six services were operated on the first day, netting a revenue of  through the sale of tickets and smart cards. Sixty-four services were operated on the second day of operations, a frequency of one train every 7–8 minutes. On the second day operations, the MMRDA also announced that it had decided to install three benches on each platform. The line transported 19,800 people on Day 3, operating a total of 64 trips. In the first week of operations (2–8 February 2014), the monorail transported 1,36,865 passengers in about 512 trips, earning a total revenue of 14,24,810. A total of 1,32,523 tokens and 1409 smart cards were also sold during the first week. Between 8–15 February 142,410 commuters travelled across the corridor in over 521 trips, earning the monorail a total revenue of 27,95,115. More than 500 smart cards were sold in the second week itself. Ridership dropped 18% in the third week compared to the first week. About 1.12 lakh passengers made 475 trips on the monorail, earning a revenue of 10.50 lakh. Revenues dropped by over 40% in the fourth week of operations (compared to the first week), as 92,771 rode the monorail. According to the MMRDA, between 2 February and 1 March, a total of 4,58,871 commuters used the monorail, generating a total revenue 44,66,522.

Over the next two weeks, 76,590 and 41,405 passengers respectively traveled on the line. The average daily ridership dropped from 20,000 during the first few weeks to 15,000 by March 2014. In the last full week of 8-hour operations (from 6 to 12 April), 65,760 commuters used the monorail. Services began operating for 14-hours daily, beginning 15 April 2014, carrying 15,016 commuters for revenue of 1.32 lakh. By the last week of January 2015, the monorail had ferried nearly 51 lakh passengers since it began operations.

Consumption of food and chewing tobacco in the premises above the concourse is prohibited.

According to a passenger survey by the MMRDA, 73% of the monorail commuters are regular users, commuting to their workplace or educational institute. Seventy percent of commuters reached stations on foot. Commuters in the age group of 16–22 years made up 33% of the ridership, and those in the age groups of 23–30 years and 31–58 years made up 29% each.

References

Mumbai Monorail
Railway lines opened in 2014
2014 establishments in Maharashtra